Hrvoje Jančetić (born 10 February 1981 in Zagreb) is a Croatian retired football player.

References

1981 births
Living people
Footballers from Zagreb
Association football fullbacks
Croatian footballers
Croatia youth international footballers
NK Zagreb players
NK TŠK Topolovac players
Győri ETO FC players
NK Međimurje players
Egaleo F.C. players
NK Inter Zaprešić players
HNK Gorica players
NK Zelina players
First Football League (Croatia) players
Croatian Football League players
Nemzeti Bajnokság I players
Super League Greece players
Football League (Greece) players
Croatian expatriate footballers
Expatriate footballers in Hungary
Croatian expatriate sportspeople in Hungary
Expatriate footballers in Greece
Croatian expatriate sportspeople in Greece